David Potts may refer to:
 David M. Potts (politician) (1906–1976), congressman from New York
 David Potts Jr. (1794–1863), anti-Masonic congressman from Pennsylvania
 David M. Potts (academic) (born 1952), professor of analytical soil mechanics at Imperial College London
 David Potts (businessman) (born 1957), CEO of the British supermarket chain Morrisons
 David Potts (photographer) (1926–2012), Australian photographer
 David Potts (TV personality) (born 1993), English television personality
 David Potts, English head rep of Ibiza Weekender
 David Potts, English rock singer, former member of Monaco (band)
 David Potts, Conservative leader of South Tyneside council